John Eiseman (October 13, 1925 – April 26, 2016) was an American sprint canoer who competed in the late 1940s and early 1950s. Competing in two Summer Olympics, he earned his best finish of 13th in the K-2 10000 m event at London in 1948. He was born in Philadelphia.

References
John Eiseman's profile at Sports Reference.com
Mention of John Eiseman's death (page 33)

1925 births
2016 deaths
Sportspeople from Philadelphia
American male canoeists
Canoeists at the 1948 Summer Olympics
Canoeists at the 1952 Summer Olympics
Olympic canoeists of the United States